Turkish National Paralympic Committee is the National Paralympic Committee representing Turkey. It was founded in 2002.

The organization's office is situated at Hatta Halim Sok. 13/1 in Gayrettepe neighborhood of Beşiktaş, Istanbul.

See also
Turkish National Olympic Committee

References

External links
 

Turkey
Turkey at the Paralympics
2002 establishments in Turkey
Organizations based in Istanbul
Beşiktaş
Disability organizations based in Turkey